Joanne Vella Cuschieri is a Maltese judge.

See also 
Judiciary of Malta

References

External links
https://daphnecaruanagalizia.com/2017/01/lets-not-forget-owen-bonnici-made-woman-magistrate/

Living people
20th-century Maltese judges
21st-century Maltese judges
Maltese women
Year of birth missing (living people)
20th-century women judges
21st-century women judges